Adam Charles Willits (born 18 February 1972) is an Australian former actor, best known for being an original cast member of the television soap opera Home and Away as foster child Steven Matheson  from 1988 to 1991. In 1995, Willits returned to the show as a regular and  a love interest for the character of Selina Roberts, portrayed by Tempany Deckert  and remained until late 1996 as well as returning for guest stints in 1997, 1998, 2000, 2002, 2003 and the last time in 2008.

He appeared in the film Mad Max Beyond Thunderdome

TV series include  sitcom Hampton Court, All Saints and serial Rake

Willits was one of several Home and Away cast-members to star in a stage musical based on the soap, which toured the UK in 1991. Julian McMahon, Sharyn Hodgson, Mouche Phillips and Justine Clarke also starred. Adam has since dropped out of the limelight and now works in the insurance industry.

Filmography

References

External links
 

1972 births
Living people
Male actors from Sydney
Australian male child actors
Australian male television actors